The Miles River is a  tidal river in Talbot County, Maryland. It is a tributary of the Eastern Bay and is thus part of the Chesapeake Bay watershed.

Etymology
Miles River was originally called the St. Michaels River; it derives its name from Saint Michael, the patron saint of Colonial Maryland.

Geography

References

External links
Chesapeake Bay Program Watershed Profile: Miles River

Rivers of Maryland
Tributaries of the Chesapeake Bay
Rivers of Talbot County, Maryland